John Frederick George McCarthy (born 30 March 1967) is a former Australian rules footballer who played with North Melbourne and Fitzroy in the VFL/AFL. Originally from Wales, McCarthy is one of the most successful Australian rules football players to have been born overseas. Between 1989 and 1993 he represented Tasmania regularly at interstate football.

McCarthy grew up in Tasmania and played his early football with North Hobart and developed into  a key position player. He debuted in the VFL for North Melbourne in 1986 and spent seven seasons with the club. In 1993 he moved to Fitzroy and kicked 40 goals in his debut season.

References

External links

1967 births
Living people
VFL/AFL players born outside Australia
Australian rules footballers from Tasmania
Fitzroy Football Club players
North Melbourne Football Club players
North Hobart Football Club players
North Hobart Football Club coaches
Tasmanian State of Origin players
Welsh emigrants to Australia
Tasmanian Football Hall of Fame inductees